Down Among the Z Men is a 1952 black-and-white British comedy film starring the Goons: Spike Milligan, Peter Sellers, Michael Bentine and Harry Secombe. The movie was filmed early in the Goons' career before many of the show's recurring characters were created, and the stars only play one character each: Eccles (Milligan), Colonel Bloodnok (Sellers), Osric Pureheart (Bentine) and Harry Jones (Secombe).

Plot
Harry Jones (Secombe) is a clerk in Mr Crab's general mercantile store and an amateur actor in community theatre, where he is currently playing a Scotland Yard inspector, "Batts of the Yard". When the absentminded Professor Osrick Pureheart (Bentine) leaves a secret military formula in the store, mayhem ensues as two suspicious secret agents (actually enemy spies), who have been shadowing the professor, question Harry regarding the professor, none of them realising that Harry now has the formula in his possession.

Convinced by the two spies to follow the professor, Harry goes to an Army post, Camp Warwell, where he is mistakenly enlisted in the Z Men, ostensibly an elite unit guarding atomic secrets but in reality a ragtag group of reservists, retreads, and others of marginal (at best) competence. The spies kidnap an adjutant newly assigned to the camp and one of them then impersonates him to gain entry to Camp Warwell.

The post's commander, Colonel Bloodnok (Sellers), has been assigned for security purposes a supposed "daughter" (Carole Carr) who is actually a female MI5 operative. Harry soon becomes smitten with the "daughter", and they work together to foil an attempt by the secret agents to purloin Pureheart's formula.

Title
National Service in Britain in the 1950s obliged all fit British men to serve in the military for two years, and thereafter three and a half years in the reserves. "Category Z" was one of the classes of reserve organization. During the Korean War there was much apprehension that, in order to supply enough troops, the government might remobilize "Z-men" who had been released after their two years in uniform.

As the letter "Z" is pronounced as "Zed" in Queen's English, the title is also a pun on a traditional drinking song, "Down Among the Dead Men".

Production
Down Among the Z Men is the only film starring all four Goons; Bentine was absent from the 1951 Penny Points to Paradise. In the film, Bentine, Milligan and Sellers repeated their radio characters, whereas Secombe's Neddy Seagoon was replaced with a less-raucous Harry Jones.

The film was shot at the Maida Vale Studios in London, with sets designed by the art director Don Russell.
The production was shot over a two-week shooting schedule. Milligan, who wrote most of the radio scripts for the Goons, had no role creating in the film's screenplay. Bentine would later tell an interviewer that the film's lack of financing required director Maclean Rogers to only permit one take per scene. Rogers, however, incorporated two dance numbers into the film featuring showgirls as female soldiers practising for a talent show.

Release
Down Among the Z Men was not a commercial success in Great Britain. Since the Goons were unknown in the United States at the time, there was no theatrical release to the American market. Years later, after Sellers became a major film star, bootleg 16mm prints of the film began to turn up in the US, sometimes under the new title The Goon Show Movie.

Cast
 Harry Secombe as Harry Jones
 Michael Bentine as Prof. Osrick Pureheart
 Spike Milligan as Pte. Eccles
 Peter Sellers as Colonel Bloodnok
 Carole Carr as Carole Gayley
 The Television Toppers as Dancers 
 Clifford Stanton as Stanton
 Robert Cawdron as Sergeant Bullshine
 Andrew Timothy as Captain Evans
 Graham Stark as Spider
 Russ Allen as Brigadier's ADC
 Elizabeth Kearns as Girl in Shop
 Miriam Karlin as Woman in Shop
 Sidney Vivian as Landlord
 Eunice Gayson as Officer's Wife

References

External links
 
 
 

1952 films
British comedy films
1952 comedy films
Films directed by Maclean Rogers
Military humor in film
1950s spy comedy films
British black-and-white films
1950s English-language films
1950s British films